Jon Douglas McCracken (born 24 May 2000) is a Scottish professional footballer who plays as a goalkeeper for  club Stevenage, on loan from EFL Championship club Norwich City.

Club career

Norwich City
McCracken began his career at Hamilton Academical, before signing for Norwich City's academy in 2016. After spending the 2018–19 season playing for Norwich's under-23 team, McCracken went on a one-week trial with Premier League club Burnley in July 2019. No transfer materialised and he remained at Norwich for the 2019–20 season, missing the second half of that season after suffering a stress fracture in his back. He trained with the Norwich first team at the start of the 2020–21 season and was an unused substitute in an EFL Cup match against Luton Town on 5 September 2020. He played in all three of the club's EFL Trophy matches during the season. McCracken agreed a contract extension to remain at Norwich on 22 December 2020, with the new agreement running until July 2022. He signed a further two-year contract extension on 4 March 2022, highlighting a possible loan move in order to gain match-playing experience.

Loan to Bohemian
Ahead of the 2022–23 season, McCracken trained with National League club Southend United ahead of a proposed season-long loan move. He suffered an injury during the trial and returned to Norwich to receive treatment. McCracken subsequently joined League of Ireland Premier Division club Bohemian on loan on 21 July 2022, on an agreement until 31 December 2022. McCracken kept a clean sheet on his senior debut in a 2–0 away victory against Lucan United in the FAI Cup on 22 August 2022. He provided cover for first choice goalkeeper James Talbot during his time there, making seven appearances in all competitions.

Loan to Stevenage
McCracken signed for League Two club Stevenage on an emergency loan deal on 10 March 2023. He made his English Football League debut a day later in Stevenage's 3–1 victory against Walsall.

International career
McCracken made his debut for the Scotland under-17 team in 2017, making six appearances throughout the 2017 UEFA European Under-17 Championship qualification stage.

Career statistics

References

External links

2000 births
Living people
Scottish footballers
Association football goalkeepers
Norwich City F.C. players
Bohemian F.C. players
Stevenage F.C. players
English Football League players
League of Ireland players
Hamilton Academical F.C. players